Olga Capri (18 May 1883 – 18 December 1961) was a stage and film actress from Italy. She appeared in more than 40 films during her career, generally in supporting roles. She appeared in several of Alessandro Blasetti's early sound films, such as Mother Earth (1931).

Selected filmography
 The Betrothed (1923)
 The Song of Love (1930)
 Mother Earth (1931)
 Figaro and His Great Day (1931)
 Resurrection (1931)
 Palio (1932)
 Zaganella and the Cavalier (1932)
 The Gift of the Morning (1932)
 Venus (1932)
 Paradise (1932)
 Fanny (1933)
 Steel (1933)
 The Three Wishes (1937)
 The Castiglioni Brothers (1937)
 The Night of Tricks (1939)
 Before the Postman (1942)
 The Peddler and the Lady (1943)
 Daniele Cortis (1947)

References

External links

1883 births
1961 deaths
Italian film actresses
Italian silent film actresses
Italian stage actresses
Actresses from Rome
20th-century Italian actresses